Redlands, Sydney Church of England Co-educational Grammar School, is a multi-campus independent co-educational early learning, primary, and secondary day Christian school, in the Anglican tradition, located in Cremorne on the Lower North Shore of Sydney, New South Wales, Australia. Established in 1884, the non-selective school and caters for approximately 1,600 students from early learning and on to Year K to Year 12.

Redlands is a member of the Association of Independent Schools NSW, the Independent Schools Association, the Junior School Heads Association of Australia, and the Council of International Schools.

History 

Established in 1884 as a school for girls (and boys in the younger years) and run by the Misses Liggins and Arnold until around 1910. The school was purchased by Gertrude Amy Roseby and her sister Mabel in 1911 who ran it until 1945.

Redlands later established an association with the Anglican Diocese of Sydney and became the Sydney Church of England Girls Grammar School, Redlands in 1945; abbreviated as SCEGGS. Redlands severed legal ties with the Anglican Diocese in 1976, and was re-constituted as a wholly independent school. SCEGGS, Redlands (as it then was), SCEGGS Darlinghurst, SCEGGS Wollongong and SCEGGS Loquat Valley survived by re-constituting themselves as wholly independent entities, severing their legal ties with the Anglican diocese while retaining the Church of England title in their corporate names. SCEGGS Moss Vale, was unable to recover, and closed. Loquat Valley became a member of the Sydney Anglican Schools Corporation.

When the school became co-educational, its title changed to Sydney Church of England Co-educational Grammar School, Redlands; abbreviated as SCECGS Redlands.

Motto 
It appears in the school song which was shared with the other SCEGGS schools:

 Students of Redlands School, those old and new
 Gathered or parted, all the world through
 Still to the motto that binds us keep true:
 Luceat Lux Vestra.

After the collapse of the SCEGGS school network, and Redlands' admission of boys in 1978, the first line of the SCEGGS song was altered at Redlands to "Students of Redlands School, those old and new...."

School governance
Since the Sydney Anglican SCEGGS schools collapse, Redlands has been independently owned and operated by SCECGS Redlands Limited — a public company limited by guarantee. 
The role of the Board is to oversee the management and business of the company, and in particular to:
 Appoint the School Principal and monitor performance
 Establish the vision and strategic direction of the School
 Support the School Executive and management in the implementation of that vision and strategic direction
 Ensure that the resources necessary for the achievement of agreed goals are available.

Academic offerings 
Redlands offers the International Baccalaureate as well as the New South Wales Higher School Certificate. Redlands has offered the International Baccalaureate since 1989, longer than any other school in NSW. In 2016, eight students achieved an ATAR of 99 or more and one third of students achieved an ATAR of 95 or more.

Campus facilities

Redlands occupies two campuses in Sydney, including the former Cremorne Girls High School site on Murdoch Street, which it purchased from the Government of New South Wales in 1989. This site houses the Preschool, Preparatory and Junior School students. The Senior Campus on Military Road is for the Secondary School students.

The school operates Redlands Preschools at Cremorne and North Balgowlah, and also operates an experiential outdoor education site, the High Country Campus, in Jindabyne.

Peter J. Cornish was appointed Principal in 1981, and is credited with returning the school to financial security and academic respectability in the period 1981 to 2002. Cornish was formerly Deputy Headmaster of The Armidale School, and previously an English master at Shore (Sydney Church of England Grammar School), both Anglican boys' schools.  He emphasised academic achievement, as well as developing numerous sport and co-curricular opportunities.  Cornish cultivated an association with several neighbouring Anglican parishes, including the immediately adjacent mainstream Anglican parish of St Peter's, Cremorne, and indeed the school continues use of the parish church as the Secondary School chapel. On Foundation Day 2007, the Governor Phillip Building was renamed the Peter Cornish Building, in recognition and honour of his achievements and progressions in the school. The Boys 1st IV Rowing boat was also named in his honour at a ceremony on 16 March 2008.

At the end of 2006, Christopher Daunt Watney, former Principal of Redlands, concluded 4 years at the School. Neil Tucker temporarily filled the role until the end of 2007. In July 2007 the Board announced the appointment of Dr Peter Lennox as Principal from early 2008.

In 2007, the school celebrated the completion of refurbishment of the Secondary School Science laboratories and renamed the building Roseby - in recognition of the school's longest serving Headmistress (1911–1945) -  G. A. Roseby. The board also announced the naming of The Adams Centre (former Cremorne Post Office) building on the southern side of Military Road.

In 2010 the school completed the Redlands Fitness Centre which is now used regularly by a majority of Redlands students for fitness training.

In 2010-11, a major development was undertaken on the Murdoch Street Campus as part of the Federal government BER program. The 1960s three-storey building was demolished to make way for the new home for the Margaret Roberts Preparatory School (K-2) and an all purpose sports and assembly hall. The development now features a state of the art playground, larger  oval and new enclosed ball games court for students to play on. The school is now divided into a Redlands House Early Childhood (Preschool) and K-2 and 3-6 on the Murdoch Street Campus, called the Junior Campus; and a Years 7-12 on the Military Road Campus, named the Senior Campus.

In 2016, the school commenced redevelopment of the Senior Campus.

Dr Peter Lennox retired after 12 years of exemplary service to the school and Stephen Webber commenced as Principal in January 2020.

Principals

House system 
Redlands has four houses; Cowper, Dumolo, McDouall and Roseby. Each is named after a notable family or person linked with the school's history. Each student wears a badge on their blazer. School pride amongst students is most prominent at the school's yearly Swimming Carnival, Cross Country Carnival, Athletics Carnival and performing arts night - Gala Arts.

Sport 
Redlands is a member of the Independent Schools Association (ISA), also competing against the Athletic Association of the Great Public Schools of New South Wales (AAGPS) in some sports. The school offers both representative and non-representative sports, with students being required to compete in one representative sport a year (either Summer or Winter). In the Senior School, many students participate in basketball and netball.

The school's rowing program is now situated at Mosman Rowing Club, Pearl Bay for on water training, after an arson attack destroyed the shed at Tambourine Bay in 2007.

Summer sports include basketball, swimming, tennis, touch football, indoor hockey, rowing, and sailing. Winter sports include AFL, athletics, cross country, soccer, hockey, netball, rugby, snowsports, tennis, and water polo.

Redlands Art Prize

The school has hosted the Redlands Art Prize since 1996. Since 2013 it has been named the Redlands Konica Minolta Art Prize and sponsored by Konica Minolta. It was formerly called the Redlands Westpac Art Prize after its then sponsor Westpac.

From 2012 it has been presented at the National Art School in Darlinghurst, after 15 years of being presented by the school and then by Mosman Gallery. The prize was worth  in 2017. As an acquisitive prize, the substantial collection is displayed at the school. Past winners have included Imants Tillers, Pat Brassington, Callum Morton,  Julie Gough, Vernon Ah Kee, Ben Quilty, Lindy Lee, Fiona Foley and Tom Polo (2014).

Notable alumni

Elizabeth Allen poet
Rachael Beckmusical theatre (Singin' in the Rain, The Sound of Music) and television star (Hey Dad..!, It Takes Two)
Charlotte Bestactress and model
Eleanor Darkauthor, Australian Literature Society Gold Medal for literature
Amy DicksonGrammy nominated classical saxophonist
Sophie Falkinertelevision presenter
Nick FisherOlympic freestyle
Karyn GojnichOlympic sailor
Thistle Yolette Harrisa botanist, educator, author and conservationist
Janusz Hookerbusinessman and Olympic bronze medalist
Diana Horvath doctor and medical administrator
Anna LunoeDJ, vocalist, songwriter and producer 
Helen Murrell Chief Justice of the ACT Supreme Court
Ellice Nosworthyarchitect
Alison Rehfischpainter
Victoria RobertsOlympic rower, three-time world champion
Kathryn Robinsonjournalist, television and radio presenter
Catriona Rowntreetelevision presenter on Channel Nine's "Getaway" program
Ruel (singer)singer

See also

List of non-government schools in New South Wales
50th Redlands International Cadet Australian Championship

References

External links 
 
 Crikey Alumni List

Educational institutions established in 1884
Private primary schools in Sydney
Private secondary schools in Sydney
Junior School Heads Association of Australia Member Schools
Nondenominational Christian schools in New South Wales
Independent Schools Association (Australia)
International Baccalaureate schools in Australia
Cremorne, New South Wales
1884 establishments in Australia